Piotr Cetnarowicz (born 19 May 1973 in Iława) is a Polish footballer who currently plays for Orkan Rumia.

External links
 
 

1973 births
Living people
People from Iława
Polish footballers
Pomezania Malbork players
Dyskobolia Grodzisk Wielkopolski players
Jeziorak Iława players
Ceramika Opoczno players
Górnik Łęczna players
FC Kryvbas Kryvyi Rih players
KSZO Ostrowiec Świętokrzyski players
MG MZKS Kozienice players
Tur Turek players
Lechia Gdańsk players
Ukrainian Premier League players
Sportspeople from Warmian-Masurian Voivodeship
Polish expatriate footballers
Expatriate footballers in Ukraine
Polish expatriate sportspeople in Ukraine
Association football forwards